Arthur Richard Kempton (29 January 1889 – December 1958) was an English professional footballer who played as a goalkeeper in the Football League for Reading. In 2018, he was named in the RAF XI.

Personal life 
Kempton worked as a carpenter. In July 1916, two years after the outbreak of the First World War, he enlisted as an Air Mechanic 2nd Class in the Royal Flying Corps. By September 1918, Kempton had been promoted to corporal. Nearly 18 months after the armistice, he was discharged from the RAF Reserve in April 1920.

Career statistics

References

External links 
Arthur Kempton at arsenal.com

English footballers
English Football League players
Military personnel from Essex
Royal Air Force airmen
1889 births
1958 deaths
People from West Thurrock
Association football goalkeepers
Royal Flying Corps soldiers
Royal Air Force personnel of World War I
Hastings & St Leonards United F.C. players
Tufnell Park F.C. players
Arsenal F.C. players
Reading F.C. players
Folkestone F.C. players
Tunbridge Wells F.C. players
English carpenters
20th-century British businesspeople